Jawahar Navodaya Vidyalaya, Mandi or locally known as JNV Pandoh is a boarding, co-educational school in Mandi district of Himachal Pradesh state in India. Navodaya Vidyalayas are funded by the Indian Ministry of Human Resources Development and administered  by Navodaya Vidyalaya Smiti, an autonomous body under the ministry.

History 
The school was established on 11 September 1986, and is a part of Jawahar Navodaya Vidyalaya schools. The permanent campus of this school is located at Pandoh, Mandi. This school is administered and monitored by Chandigarh regional office of Navodaya Vidyalaya Smiti.

Admission 
Admission to JNV Mandi at class VI level is made through selection test conducted by Navodaya Vidyalaya Smiti. The information about test is disseminated and advertised in the district by the office of Mandi district magistrate (Collector), who is also chairperson of Vidyalya Management Committee.

Affiliations 
JNV Mandi is affiliated to Central Board of Secondary Education with affiliation number 640003, following the curriculum prescribed by CBSE.

See also 

 List of JNV schools
 Jawahar Navodaya Vidyalaya, Sirmaur
 Jawahar Navodaya Vidyalaya, Bilaspur

References

External links 

 Official Website of JNV Mandi

High schools and secondary schools in Himachal Pradesh
Mandi
Educational institutions established in 1986
1986 establishments in Himachal Pradesh
Schools in Mandi district